Aston Villa had a disappointing 1889–90, their 2nd season in the Football League, having finished second in the previous season. They started with an unbeaten opening three games including a win over champions Preston, but suffered several defeats after Christmas, winning only one of their six remaining league games. 

Preston's "Invincibles" were unbeaten from the previous season. They had now won their first league match to stretch their unbeaten league run to 23 games but faced a Villa team who would inflict their first-ever league defeat with a 5–3 victory. 
	
Scottish centre back, Jimmy Cowan, made his debut, coming from Vale of Leven FC. He would go on to make 357 appearances for Villa, his last win seeing Small Heath knocked out of the 1901 FA Cup Quarter-final replay.

A benefit match was held for Small Heath player, Chris Charsley, ahead of his retirement; despite the admission charge being increased for the occasion, around 6,000 spectators turned up to watch a schoolboys' match followed by the main attraction. In an encounter described by the Birmingham Daily Post as "perhaps the closest and most exciting ever played on the field", Aston Villa, featuring new signing Tom McKnight, drew 2–2 with a Small Heath eleven. A substantial sum was raised.

Results

League

The table below lists all the results of Aston Villa in the Football League for the 1889–90 season

FA Cup

1st Round, 18 January 1890, South Shore (Blackpool), Away, Won 4–2
2nd Round, 1 February 1890, Notts County, Away, Lost 1–4

References

Aston Villa F.C. seasons
Aston Villa F.C.